Peter Howard Moore (born 19 September 1946) is a British serial killer who managed cinemas in Bagillt, Holyhead, Kinmel Bay and Denbigh in North Wales at the time of his arrest. He murdered four men in 1995. Due to his attire when committing sexual attacks, he was also called the "man in black".

Crimes
Between September and December 1995, he stabbed to death and mutilated four men "for fun". He was sentenced to life imprisonment in November 1996 with a recommendation that he never be released. He also committed 39 sex attacks on men in North Wales and the Merseyside area over a 20-year period.

Victims
Henry Roberts, a 56-year-old man who lived in Anglesey; stabbed to death in September 1995
Edward Carthy, a 28-year-old man whom Moore met in a gay bar; stabbed to death in Clocaenog Forest in October 1995
Keith Randles, a 49-year-old traffic manager; stabbed to death in November 1995 on the A5 road in Anglesey
Anthony Davies, a 40-year-old crematorium worker; stabbed to death on Pensarn Beach, Abergele in December 1995

Trial
During his trial, Moore told the jury the crimes were committed by a fictitious homosexual lover he nicknamed Jason after the killer in the Friday the 13th horror films. The jury found him guilty on all counts.

Imprisonment
During his time in Wakefield Prison Moore befriended fellow serial killer Harold Shipman. Shipman died by suicide in his cell in January 2004.

In June 2008, Moore was told by the High Court that he would spend the rest of his life in prison. On 3 March 2011, Moore challenged the ruling in the European Court of Human Rights (ECHR), with a view to having his sentence quashed and such whole life order sentences outlawed throughout Europe. On 17 January 2012, it was announced that his appeal had failed. However, on 9 July 2013, it was announced the ECHR had ruled there had to be both a possibility of release and review to be compatible with human rights.

In February 2015, the ECHR upheld the lawfulness of whole life orders, on the ground that they can be reviewed in exceptional circumstances, following a fresh challenge by murderer Arthur Hutchinson, who had been sentenced to life imprisonment for a triple murder in Sheffield more than 30 years earlier. Another legal challenge to the court by Hutchinson was rejected in January 2017. A fresh challenge by another "whole life" prisoner, Jamie Reynolds, who murdered a teenage girl in Shropshire in 2013, is now reportedly pending with the ECHR. By this stage, there were believed to be more than 70 prisoners in England and Wales serving whole life sentences.

Other

On 13 October 2011, it was falsely reported that Moore had died at Broadmoor hospital on 30 July 2011.

Moore talked to police and said that he knew the identity of Clocaenog Forest Man. It was reported that this theory was discounted due to conflicting dates.

See also
 List of serial killers in the United Kingdom
 Colin Norris – fellow UK gay serial killer, convicted in 2008

References

1946 births
20th-century British criminals
Living people
Male serial killers
People convicted of murder by England and Wales
People from Rhyl
Place of birth missing (living people)
Prisoners sentenced to life imprisonment by England and Wales
Violence against gay men
Violence against LGBT people in the United Kingdom
Violence against men in the United Kingdom
Welsh rapists
Welsh serial killers